Berenger Aymard Bosse or Aymard Bosse Beranger (born 13 March 1985) is a Central African sprinter who specializes in the 100 metres.

Career
He competed at the 2007 World Championships, the 2008 Olympic Games and the 2012 Olympic Games without progressing to the second round. In Beijing he finished in sixth place in his first round heat in a time of 10.51 seconds. In London he finished in first place in his preliminary round heat in a time of 10.55, however, he finished seventh in his Round 1 heat, again in a time of 10.55.

His personal best time is 10.38 seconds, achieved in April 2007 in Dakar.

In January 2016 he tested positive for an illegal substance, prednisolone, and was banned from competition for three years. His ban lasts from 31 January 2016 to 3 March 2019.

References

External links

1985 births
Living people
Central African Republic male sprinters
Athletes (track and field) at the 2008 Summer Olympics
Athletes (track and field) at the 2012 Summer Olympics
Olympic athletes of the Central African Republic
People from Bangui
World Athletics Championships athletes for the Central African Republic